Adukkamparai is a small town in Vellore City. Vellore district, Tamil Nadu,  India. It is situated on the Vellore to Cuddalore  highway (8.9 km) from Vellore..  There is a government hospital and medical college located at Adukkamparai.

Cities and towns in Vellore district